Hyalorisia is a genus of small sea snails, marine gastropod mollusks in the family Capulidae, the cap snails.

Species
Species within the genus Hyalorisia include:
 Hyalorisia fragilis (E. A. Smith, 1904)
 Hyalorisia galea (Dall, 1889)
 Hyalorisia kely Fassio, Bouchet & Oliverio, 2020
 Hyalorisia lehibe Fassio, Bouchet & Oliverio, 2020
 Hyalorisia madagascarensis Fassio, Bouchet & Oliverio, 2020
 Hyalorisia melanesica Fassio, Bouchet & Oliverio, 2020
 Hyalorisia nanhaiensis Fassio, Bouchet & Oliverio, 2020
 Hyalorisia neocaledonica Fassio, Bouchet & Oliverio, 2020
 † Hyalorisia nettlesi (J. E. Robinson, 1983) 
 Hyalorisia nupta Fassio, Bouchet & Oliverio, 2020
 Hyalorisia profunda Fassio, Bouchet & Oliverio, 2020
 Hyalorisia solomonensis Fassio, Bouchet & Oliverio, 2020
 Hyalorisia tosaensis (Otuka, 1939)

References

External links
 Dall, W. H. (1889). Reports on the results of dredging, under the supervision of Alexander Agassiz, in the Gulf of Mexico (1877-78) and in the Caribbean Sea (1879-80), by the U.S. Coast Survey Steamer "Blake", Lieut.-Commander C.D. Sigsbee, U.S.N., and Commander J.R. Bartlett, U.S.N., commanding. XXIX. Report on the Mollusca. Part 2, Gastropoda and Scaphopoda. Bulletin of the Museum of Comparative Zoölogy at Harvard College. 18: 1-492, pls. 10-40
 Fassio G., Russini V., Buge B., Schiaparelli S., Modica M.V., Bouchet P. & Oliverio M. (2020). High cryptic diversity in the kleptoparasitic genus Hyalorisia Dall, 1889 (Littorinimorpha: Capulidae) with the description of nine new species from the Indo-West Pacific. Journal of Molluscan Studies; DOI: 10.1093/mollus/eyaa028, 21 pp

Capulidae